V. C. Kesava Rao was  an Indian politician. He was a Member of Parliament  representing Andhra Pradesh in the Rajya Sabha the upper house of India's Parliament as member  of the  Indian National Congress.

References

Rajya Sabha members from Andhra Pradesh
Indian National Congress politicians
1917 births
1995 deaths